Bridge L7075 is a historic arch bridge in Hartford Township, Minnesota, United States.  It was initially built around 1940 by the Works Progress Administration with a modular corrugated iron product called Multi Plate for the arches and a masonry façade.  The bridge was expanded with a third arch around 1942.  It was listed on the National Register of Historic Places as Bridge No. L7075 in 2016 for having local significance in the theme of engineering.  It was nominated for being a distinctive example of the era's Multi Plate arch bridges and for the fine workmanship embodied in its WPA rustic architecture with Neoclassical detailing.

See also
 List of bridges on the National Register of Historic Places in Minnesota
 National Register of Historic Places listings in Todd County, Minnesota

References

External links
 Bridge L7075–Minnesota Department of Transportation

1940 establishments in Minnesota
Arch bridges in the United States
Bridges completed in 1942
Buildings and structures in Todd County, Minnesota
Iron bridges in the United States
National Register of Historic Places in Todd County, Minnesota
Road bridges on the National Register of Historic Places in Minnesota
Transportation in Todd County, Minnesota
Works Progress Administration in Minnesota